is the gate at the entrance of a Buddhist temple in Japan. It often precedes the bigger and more important sanmon.

References

Gates in Japan
Japanese architectural features
Japanese Buddhist architecture